Duhsala is a princess of Hastinapura, and the only daughter of King Dhritarashtra and Queen Gandhari in the Hindu epic Mahabharata. She was born after the birth of her Kaurava brothers and her paternal half-sibling, Yuyutsu. She is married to Jayadratha, the king of Sindhu. She has a son named Suratha, and a daughter named Roshni.

Legend 

When Jayadratha tried to kidnap and molest Draupadi and failed, some of the Pandavas decided to slay him. But on Yudhishthira's plea to prevent Dushshala from becoming a widow, they left him alone, just shaving his head. Later, Jayadratha played a vital role in getting Abhimanyu, the son of Arjuna, killed in the Kurukhsetra war to satiate his vengeance. But Arjuna, with the help of Krishna, decapitated him. 

Later, during the ashvamedha sacrifice, the horse of the Pandavas came to Sindhu, which was then ruled by Suratha, the son of Dushshala. Suratha with other archers confronted Arjuna, who slew Suratha and his army. Dushshala came to the battlefield, wailing with the infant son of Suratha, which shattered Arjuna with sorrow. Arjuna proclaimed the infant the king of Sindhu.

References

External links

Characters in Hindu mythology
Characters in the Mahabharata